Wenchuan County is a county in Ngawa Tibetan and Qiang Autonomous Prefecture, Sichuan, People's Republic of China.

Wolong National Nature Reserve is a protected area located in Wenchuan County, which houses more than 150 highly endangered giant pandas. The Wolong Special Administrative Region is also located here.

The county was the site of the epicentre and one of the areas most severely hit by the 2008 Sichuan earthquake, also known as the Wenchuan earthquake.

Toponymy 
The county is named after the Wenshui River, now known as the Min River.

History 
Wenchuan County was established in 1958, when the former Maowen Qiang Autonomous County was split into Mao County and Wenchuan County.

Wenchuan earthquake

On May 12, 2008, an earthquake with moment magnitude 7.9 hit the Sichuan Province, with epicentre located in the town of Yingxiu, in Wenchuan county. The county was therefore one of the areas most severely affected by the earthquake. In Chinese, the earthquake is named after the county (the Wenchuan earthquake, 汶川地震), which made its name resonate across the nation. In the county, 15,941 people died, 34,583 were injured, and 7,474 were still missing as of June 6, 2008. The seismic intensity was the highest, reaching level XI in the China Seismic Intensity Scale. After the earthquake, the central government enforced stricter requirements for seismic design in this area. The earthquake also caused many landslides, some of which remained active for years and generated destructive debris flows during the summer rainstorms, which increased the death toll and slowed reconstruction and recovery of the communities in the county.

Subdivisions

Demographics 

According to a 2021 publication by the county government, Wenchuan County's ethnic composition is 39.5% Qiang, 38.7% Han, 20.4% Tibetan, 1.1% Hui, and 0.3% belonging to other ethnic minorities.

The 2010 Chinese Census reported the county's population as 100,771 people.

In 2005, the county reported a population of 106,238, with 34.16% of the population being ethnically Qiang.

The 2000 Chinese Census reported the county's population as 111,935.

In 1996, the county's population was estimated to be about 104,000, up from the 96,054 reported in 1990.

Economy 
As of 2019, Wenchuan County's gross domestic product totaled ¥7.264 billion, a 6.2% increase from the previous year. Consumer retail sales totaled ¥1.082 billion. The annual per capita disposable income of the county reached ¥34,513 for its urban residents, and ¥15,049 for its rural residents, an increase of 8.2% and 12.0%, respectively.

According to the county government, there were 4,440 people in the county living in poverty in 2014. The county government claims that all its citizens were lifted out of poverty in 2019.

Tourism 

Wenchuan County is home to the Wolong National Nature Reserve, as well as the Sichuan Caopo Nature Reserve. Other tourist attractions in the county include the AAAAA-rated Wenchuan Special Tourist Area and the AAAA-rated Yu the Great Cultural Tourist Area.

In 2019, the county received 6,277,800 visitors, bringing the county ¥2.87 billion in revenue.

Transport

Climate

References

External links

Official website of Wenchuan County Government

 
County-level divisions of Sichuan
Ngawa Tibetan and Qiang Autonomous Prefecture